Burton and Grange is a ward of Christchurch, Dorset. Since 2019, the ward has elected 2 councillors to Bournemouth, Christchurch and Poole Council.

Geography 
The ward includes the villages/suburbs of Burton and Winkton. The ward comprises the entirety of the former Christchurch Borough Council wards of Burton & Winkton and Grange, which each elected two councillors each.

Councillors

Burton and Grange 
The ward is currently represented by two independent councillors.

Former Wards

Burton & Winkton

Grange

Election results

References 

Bournemouth Borough Council elections
Wards of Bournemouth, Christchurch and Poole